
Gmina Blizanów is a rural gmina (administrative district) in Kalisz County, Greater Poland Voivodeship, in west-central Poland.

Villages
Gmina Blizanów contains the villages and settlements of Biskupice, Blizanów, Blizanów Drugi, Blizanówek, Bogucice, Bolmów, Brudzew, Brzezina, Czajków, Czajków-Kolonia, Dębniałki, Dębniałki Kaliskie, Dojutrów, Godziątków, Grodzisk, Janków Drugi, Janków Pierwszy, Janków Trzeci, Jarantów, Jarantów-Kolonia, Jastrzębniki, Korab, Kurza, Łaszków, Łaszków-Kolonia, Lipe, Lipe Trzecie, Pamięcin, Pawłówek, Piotrów, Piskory, Poklęków, Pruszków, Romanki, Rosocha, Rychnów, Rychnów-Kolonia, Skrajnia, Skrajnia Blizanowska, Szadek, Szadek-Kolonia, Warszówka, Wyganki, Zagorzyn, Żegocin and Żerniki.

Neighbouring gminas
Gmina Blizanów is bordered by the city of Kalisz and by the gminas of Chocz, Gołuchów, Grodziec, Pleszew, Stawiszyn and Żelazków.

References
Polish official population figures 2006

Blizanow
Kalisz County